Ingraham Lake is a lake in Monroe County, Florida, United States. It located within the limits of Everglades National Park. It is accessible to the Gulf Of Mexico by the Middle Cape Canal at its northern border of the lake. It is accessible to Florida Bay by East Cape Canal, at the southern border of the lake. The entire lake is at sea level.

See also
Everglades National Park
Florida Bay
Gulf of Mexico

References 

Everglades
Lakes of Florida
Lakes of Monroe County, Florida